Podhoretz may refer to:

 Norman Podhoretz (born 1930), neoconservative writer and former editor of Commentary magazine
 John Podhoretz (born 1961), conservative writer and editor of Commentary magazine

See also
 Podhorce (disambiguation)

Jewish surnames
Slavic-language surnames